Needle spiking (also called injection spiking) is a phenomenon initially reported in the UK and Ireland where people have reported themselves subjected to surreptitious injection of unidentified sedative drugs, usually in a crowded environment such as the dancefloor of a nightclub, producing symptoms typical of date rape drugs.

No verified toxicological results have been published showing the presence of known incapacitating agents in alleged victims; the prevalence of genuine cases is unknown and has been controversial, with experts expressing doubts as to how easily such injections could be carried out without it being immediately obvious to the victim and attributing the reports to hysteria. Dr Emmanuel Puskarczyk, head of the poison control centre at the Centre hospitalier régional et universitaire de Nancy, when noting the absence of objective proof has stated that the administration of a substance would require several seconds meaning that the recipient would likely notice at the time.

A Home Affairs Committee Report noted a lack of motive in respect of needle spiking. In 692 recorded incidents there was only one claimed further offence of sexual offending or robbery.

Reports

UK 
56 reported claims of spiking by injection were recorded in September and October 2021. In Nottingham, where 15 reports of needle spiking were made in October, police identified only one case where a victim's injury "could be consistent with a needle". In November that year, there followed reports in Brighton and Eastbourne; and it was reported that  two women alleged they had been spiked with needles inside a Yorkshire nightclub. In Northern Ireland, the PSNI began an investigation after a woman believed she was spiked with a needle in Omagh on 6 November 2021. 

In December 2021, Nottinghamshire Police Service had received 146 reports of suspected needle spiking. Nine arrests were made but no suspects were subsequently charged. VICE News were informed by the National Police Chiefs' Council (NPCC) of 274 reported cases between September-November 2021 in the UK. The NPCC said that no cases of injection of drugs had been confirmed, and that there was one confirmed case of "needle-sticking", involving someone being jabbed, but not necessarily spiked, with a needle; investigations were continuing to determine whether the needle contained any spiking drugs.

Despite the allegations, there has not been a single prosecution from needle spiking in the UK. Furthermore, experts from the scientific and academic community have claimed the likelihood of being spiked by injection is extremely unlikely. Prof Adam Winstock, a trained consultant psychiatrist from the Global Drugs Survey, explained that “Needles have to be inserted with a level of care […] The idea these things can be randomly given through clothes in a club is just not that likely."

France 
Since the summer of 2021, over 100 cases of needle spiking have been reported in French nightclubs. In May 2022, the Ministry of the Interior commented that it had found the majority of those reporting incidents had been injected with something; their spokesman said, "Too often the absence of traces detected cannot be interpreted as the absence of an injection, but as sampling too late."

Ireland 
In Ireland, the Garda Síochána carried out multiple needle spiking investigations in October and November 2021. The first known report of claimed needle spiking in Ireland was on 27 October 2021, when a woman claimed she was spiked with a needle in a Dublin nightclub.

Belgium 
There has been an incident of needle spiking of football supporters in May 2022 during a match between KV Mechelen and Racing Genk. Fourteen soccer fans from the same section of the stadium felt a prick and subsequently became unwell.

Also in May 2022, in the city of Hasselt (Limburg), twenty-four youngsters became unwell at teen festival We R Young after what is thought to be an incident of needle spiking. There is still debate as to whether this may have been an incident of group panic happening.

Germany 
In May 2022, Australian musician Zoé Zanias of Linea Aspera claimed she was attacked in a needle-spiking at the Berghain nightclub in Berlin, suffering from respiratory depression and an unwanted "psychedelic" experience as a result.

Spain 
As of summer 2022, the Spanish police have registered 23 cases in Catalonia and 12 in the Basque Country. No traces of drugs were detected and there were no cases of related sexual violence.

Switzerland 
On 13 August 2022 the Street Parade, a large open air rave event with hundreds of thousands of participants, took place in Zurich. A total of 8 female attendees contacted first aid services claiming needle spiking attacks. One of the victims, a 16 year old woman, was allegedly spiked 14 times.

Australia
On April 24, 2022, a woman claimed she was spiked at a Melbourne nightclub.

Social media claims 
Claims of spiking by injection have been propagated on social media, alongside other claims of drink spiking.

Reactions 
Concerns have been raised by campaigners, politicians and student bodies. In October 2021 it was reported that British home secretary Priti Patel had requested police forces investigate the alleged incidents. In December that year, the Home Affairs Select Committee launched a new inquiry into spiking, including needle spiking, and the effectiveness of the police response to it.

Boycotts and tougher checks 
In response, a number of women from university cities decided to boycott nightclubs for "girls' nights in". Campaigners also called on nightclubs to impose tougher checks on entry; an online petition on the issue was considered by Parliament on 4 November 2021, where it was decided no changes to the law should be made.

See also
 Drink spiking
 Needlestick injury
 Pin prick attack

References 

Assault
Crimes
Incapacitating agents
October 2021 crimes in Europe
November 2021 crimes in Europe
September 2021 crimes in Europe